The Figure Four is a Canadian hardcore punk band, started in December 1997, and recorded 3 albums since. The band usually performs songs of the hardcore punk and metalcore genres. The band is currently on hiatus.

Biography
Figure Four started in December 1997, and are currently signed to Solid State Records. The band is currently on hiatus, as two of its members are now in the full-time touring hardcore punk band, Comeback Kid, and one of its members is now in a band, Grave Maker. They played a few isolated shows throughout 2006.

FF Bassist Bailey played bass for Endless Fight in 2005, Shattered Realm in 2006 the Cancer Bats in 2007 and filled in for Too Pure To Die on the latest tours.

The Belgian webzine RMP printed the rumour on the 14th of January (2011) that they were going to perform.  Figure Four performed at Rain Fest in Seattle, Washington on May 28, 2011.

Regarding the band's stance on the controversy surrounding whether or not Figure Four is still a Christian band, vocalist Andrew Neufeld had this to say at Rain Fest 2011: "It's been a while, but we haven't broke up, but the last time we played was 2006. I realized something this week; I've been involved in Figure Four for half of my life--literally...and we're definitely in different places than we were when we started this band, and we have different ideas and different beliefs, and we've moved on and we've grown older..."

Figure Four is scheduled to appear at Furnace Fest on September 24, 2022 in Birmingham Alabama.

Discography
Studio albums
No Weapon Formed Against Us (1999, Facedown Records)
When It's All Said and Done (2001, Facedown Records)
Suffering the Loss (2003, Solid State Records)

Split EPs
 Point of Recognition/Figure Four (Facedown; split w/ Point of Recognition)

Members
Last Known Lineup
 Andrew Neufeld - Vocals (Currently: Comeback Kid, Sights & Sounds)
 Jeremy Hiebert - Guitar (Currently: Comeback Kid)
 'Metal' Mel - Guitar
 Jason Bailey - Bass (Currently: Grave Maker, ex-Cancer Bats)
 'Optimus' Steve 'Prime' Dueck - Drums (ex-The Undecided)

Former
 Mike Peters - Drums
 Scott Heppner - Guitar
 Jon Kitchen - Bass

References

External links
 Figure Four Page at Solidstate Records
 Figure Four show in 2012

1997 establishments in Manitoba
Canadian Christian metal musical groups
Canadian metalcore musical groups
Christian hardcore musical groups
Musical groups established in 1997
Musical groups from Winnipeg
Solid State Records artists
Blood and Ink Records artists
Mennonite musicians